Marius Tomozei (born 9 September 1990) is a Romanian footballer who plays as a right-back for Liga II side Dinamo București.

Honours
Dunărea Călărași
Liga II: 2017–18

References

External links
 
 

1990 births
Living people
Romanian footballers
Association football defenders
Liga I players
Liga II players
Moldovan Super Liga players
ASA 2013 Târgu Mureș players
FC Botoșani players
SCM Râmnicu Vâlcea players
CS Sportul Snagov players
CS Mioveni players
CS Luceafărul Oradea players
FC Dunărea Călărași players
ACS Viitorul Târgu Jiu players
FC Metaloglobus București players
FC UTA Arad players
FC Costuleni players
FC Dinamo București players
AS Voința Snagov players
Romanian expatriate footballers
Expatriate footballers in Moldova
Romanian expatriate sportspeople in Moldova